This is a list of the main career statistics of tennis player Kim Clijsters.

Performance timelines

Only results in WTA Tour (incl. Grand Slams) main-draw, Olympic Games and Fed Cup are included in win–loss records.

Singles

Doubles

Grand Slam tournament finals

Singles: 8 finals (4 titles, 4 runner-ups)

Doubles: 3 finals (2 titles, 1 runner-up)

Mixed doubles: 1 final (1 runner-up)

Other significant finals

Year-end championships

Singles: 3 finals (3 titles)

Doubles: 1 final (1 runner-up)

Tier I / Premier-Mandatory & Premier-5

Singles: 10 finals (7 titles, 3 runner-ups)

Doubles: 3 finals (1 title, 2 runner-ups)

WTA career finals

Singles: 60 (41 titles, 19 runner-ups)

Doubles: 20 (11 titles, 9 runner-ups)

ITF Circuit finals

Singles (3–1)

Doubles (3–0)

Team competition finals: 1 final (1 title)

Junior Grand Slam finals

Singles: 1 (1 runner-up)

Doubles: 3 (2 titles, 1 runner-up)

WTA Tour career earnings 

*As of October 10, 2021

Record against other top players

Head-to-head vs. top-ten ranked players
Clijsters' record against players who have been ranked in the top 10.

Wins over reigning World No. 1's

Top-10 wins
Clijsters has a  record against players who were, at the time the match was played, ranked in the top 10.

Longest winning streak

21-match win streak (2005)

References

External links
 
 
 

Tennis career statistics